Mary Livingstone or Livingston may refer to:
Mary Livingstone (1905–1983), American radio comedian
Mary Moffat Livingstone (1821–1862), wife of the missionary, David Livingstone
Mary Livingston (1541–1582), lady-in-waiting to Mary, Queen of Scots
Mary Elizabeth Livingston, Australian artist
Mary Livingston Ripley (1914–1996), née Mary Livingston, horticulturalist